Elections to the European Parliament were held in Belgium on 17 June 1984. The Dutch-speaking electoral college elected 13 MEPs and the French-speaking electoral college elected 11 MEPs.

Results 

Belgium
European Parliament elections in Belgium
1984 elections in Belgium